Meet Market is a 2004 film directed by Charlie Loventhal and starring Alan Tudyk, Krista Allen, Elizabeth Berkley, Laurie Holden  and Julian McMahon. The movie is a comedy about singles in Los Angeles who attempt to find love in the aisles of a supermarket. The film was released directly to DVD on February 12, 2008.

Cast
 Krista Allen as Lucinda
 Elizabeth Berkley as Linda
 Susan Egan as Tess
 Suzanne Krull as Lima Lips
 Julian McMahon as Hutch
 Missi Pyle as Ericka
 Jennifer Sky as Courtney
 Alan Tudyk as Danny
 Aisha Tyler as Jane
 Robert Trebor as Director Dick
 Jack Kenny as Manager Dick
 Christine Estabrook as Mom
 Laurie Holden as Billy

External links 
 

2004 films
2004 comedy films
American comedy films
2000s English-language films
Films directed by Charlie Loventhal
2000s American films